Mandel is a surname (and occasional given name) that occurs in multiple cultures and languages. It is a Dutch, German and Jewish surname, meaning "almond", from the Middle High German and Middle Dutch mandel. Mandel can be a locational surname, from places called Mandel, such as Mandel, Germany. Mandel may also be a Dutch surname, from the Middle Dutch mandele, meaning a number of sheaves of harvested wheat.

Notable people 
Alon Mandel (born 1988), Israeli swimmer 
Babaloo Mandel (born 1949), American screenwriter
David Mandel (born 1970), American television producer and writer
Edgar Mandel (born 1928), German actor
Eli Mandel (1922–1992), Canadian writer
Emily St. John Mandel (born 1979), Canadian novelist
Emmanuil Mandel (1925–2018), Russian poet
Ernest Mandel (1923–1995), Belgian politician, professor and writer
Frank Mandel, American playwright and producer
Georges Mandel (1885–1944), French politician
Harvey Mandel (born 1945), American guitarist
Howie Mandel (born 1955), Canadian actor and comedian
Jan Mandel (born 1956), American mathematician
Jean Mandel (1911–1974), German footballer and politician
Jeanne Dorsey Mandel (1937–2001), American public official from Maryland 
Jennifer R. Mandel, American biologist
Johnny Mandel (born 1925-2020), American musician
Josh Mandel (born 1977), American politician
Julius Mandel (also known as Gyula Mándi (1899–1969), Hungarian football player and manager
Leonard Mandel (1927–2001), American physicist
Loring Mandel (born 1928), American playwright
Maria Mandel (1912–1948), Austrian Nazi official
Marvin Mandel (1920–2015) American politician
Morton Mandel (born 1921), American businessman
Robert Mandel (born 1945), American film producer
Robert Mandel  (born 1957), Hungarian musician and organologist
Rolfe D. Mandel (born 1952), American archaeologist
Sammy Mandel (1904–1967), American boxer
Semyon Mandel (1907–1974), Russian theatre and film designer
Seth Mandel (born 1982), American conservative writer and editor
Stephen Mandel (born 1945), Canadian politician
Stephen Mandel (hedge fund manager) (born 1956), American businessman
Steven L. Mandel, American anesthesiologist 
Stewart Mandel (born 1976), American sportswriter
Suzy Mandel (born 1953), British actress
Tom Mandel (futurist) (1946–1995), American futurist
Tom Mandel (poet) (born 1942), American poet
William Mandel (1917–2016), American journalist

See also
Mandell, surname
Mandl, surname
Mandle, surname
Mandal (surname)
Mendel (disambiguation)
Mendelsohn 
Mendelssohn 
Menachem Mendel

References

Dutch-language surnames
German-language surnames
Jewish surnames